PolyEast Records (formerly Canary Records, OctoArts International, OctoArts EMI Music Inc. and EMI Philippines) is a record label in the Philippines. It is a member of the Philippine Association of the Record Industry and from 2008 until 2013, the international licensee of EMI.

History 
PolyEast Records was established in 1977 as Canary Records by Orly Ilacad after leaving Vicor Music Corporation due to a major conflict with co-founder and then co-owner Vic del Rosario. Canary Records became OctoArts International in 1978. It was the first record company that introduced "minus one" (music used for karaoke) in the market.

During the 1970s, the releases of EMI Records were distributed in the Philippines by Dyna Records under the name Dyna EMI (later remained in 1992 as Dyna EMI Virgin as a result of EMI's purchase of Virgin Records). OctoArts at that time was the distributor of Sony Music's international releases. In 1995, OctoArts began a distribution deal with EMI and became OctoArts-EMI, leading to the establishment of Sony Music Philippines. In 2002, after a series of restructure, Orly Ilacad sells their stake in the label to EMI full time and it became EMI Philippines, while Ilacad later brought Orbit Music and it eventually becomes OctoArts-Orbit Music.

The PolyEast Records label initially started as a sublabel of PolyGram Philippines (later became part of Universal Music Philippines) until it was eventually acquired by EMI Philippines. It continued being an imprint of the label until 2008 when EMI withdrew from the Southeast Asian market, it became simply PolyEast Records as a joint venture between EMI itself and Piper Paper Corporation.

In the period of 2012–2013, PolyEast became independent for the second time after EMI was absorbed into Universal Music Group (MCA Music for the Filipino market).

Notable musicians

Partnerships 
 Universal Records (Philippines)
 Universal Music Group / UMUSIC Philippines

See also 
 OctoArts Films
 List of record labels

References

External links 

1977 establishments in the Philippines
EMI
Philippine record labels
Pop record labels
Rock record labels
Companies based in Quezon City
Record labels established in 1977